The Chile women's national under-23 volleyball team represents Chile in women's under-23 volleyball Events, it is controlled and managed by the Chilean Volleyball Federation that is a member of South American volleyball body Confederación Sudamericana de Voleibol (CSV) and the international volleyball body government the Fédération Internationale de Volleyball (FIVB).

Results

FIVB U23 World Championship
 Champions   Runners up   Third place   Fourth place

U23 Pan American Cup
 Champions   Runners up   Third place   Fourth place

South America U22 Championship
 Champions   Runners up   Third place   Fourth place

Team

Current squad
The following list of players represent Chile in the 2018 Women's U23 Pan-American Volleyball Cup

Head coach : Eduardo Guillaume

Notable players

References

External links
Chilean Volleyball Federation 

Volleyball
National women's under-23 volleyball teams
Volleyball in Chile